Ball of Design is an album by Dufus, released October 26, 2004.

Track listing
Freedom
Wut Kolors
Wrinkle
Radiation
Specinal
Deemon
Pakistan Enellellope
Addictive
Kids
Civil War
Sunchein

External links
[ Ball of Design] at Allmusic

2000 albums
Dufus (band) albums